The UEFA Euro 1968 quarter-finals was the last round of qualifying competition for UEFA Euro 1968. It was contested by the eight group winners of the qualifying tournament. The winners of each of four home-and-away ties qualified for the final tournament in Italy. The matches were played in April and May 1968.

Qualification

Each group winner progressed to the quarter-finals. The quarter-finals were played in two legs on a home-and-away basis. The winners of the quarter-finals would go through to the final tournament.

Summary

|}

Matches
The eight matches took place over two legs, taking place in April and May 1968. All times are CET (UTC+1).

Italy won 4–3 on aggregate and qualified for UEFA Euro 1968.

Soviet Union won 3–2 on aggregate and qualified for UEFA Euro 1968.

England won 3–1 on aggregate and qualified for UEFA Euro 1968.

Yugoslavia won 6–2 on aggregate and qualified for UEFA Euro 1968.

Goalscorers

References

External links
UEFA Euro 1968 qualifying

Play-offs
1967–68 in Bulgarian football
1967–68 in Italian football
1967–68 in Hungarian football
1968 in Soviet football
1967–68 in English football
1967–68 in Spanish football
1967–68 in French football
1967–68 in Yugoslav football
England at UEFA Euro 1968
Italy at UEFA Euro 1968
Soviet Union at UEFA Euro 1968
Yugoslavia at UEFA Euro 1968